Dafaa 302 is a 1975 Indian Hindi-language film directed by K. Shrivastava, starring Rekha and Randhir Kapoor in the lead roles. The film follows Mohan Lal as he attempts to save the employer of his brother who has been sentenced with murdering him while trying to find the real culprit. The title is a reference to Section 302 (Section of Murder) of the Indian Penal Code.

Cast
 Randhir Kapoor as Shankar/Mohan Lal
 Rekha 
 Premnath as Raja Karan Singh
 Bindu as Kamini
 Aruna Irani
 Roopesh Kumar as Girdhari
 Ajit as Saxena
 Ashok Kumar
 Chandrashekhar as Doctor
 Mohan Choti as Dilip Khanna
 Faryal as Dancer/Singer
 Gajanan Jagirdar as Judge
 Murad as D.I.G.
 Madan Puri as Inspector General of Police
 Jagdish Raj as Satish
 Asit Sen as Ramu

Soundtrack
The songs are composed by Laxmikant–Pyarelal, while all of the songs are written by Indeevar.
"Dil To Dil Hai Phul Bhi Toda Nahi Hai" - Manna Dey, Suman Kalyanpur
"Kya Lenge Aap Kuch To Lena Padega" - Asha Bhosle
"Tu Mera Ram Mai Tera Lakhan" - Kishore Kumar
"Himmatwala Meri Doli Le Jayega" - Asha Bhosle
"Panchhi Fas Gaya Jaal Me" - Lata Mangeshkar

References

External links
 
 Dafaa 302 at Kinopoisk

1975 films
1970s Hindi-language films
Films scored by Laxmikant–Pyarelal
Indian Penal Code